Georgi Raykov  (October 18, 1953 – August 12, 2006) was a Bulgarian wrestler. He was born in Sofia. He won an Olympic gold medal in Greco-Roman wrestling in 1980. He won silver medals at the 1978 and 1979 World Wrestling Championships.

References

External links
 

1953 births
2006 deaths
Sportspeople from Sofia
Olympic wrestlers of Bulgaria
Wrestlers at the 1980 Summer Olympics
Bulgarian male sport wrestlers
Olympic gold medalists for Bulgaria
Olympic medalists in wrestling
Medalists at the 1980 Summer Olympics
20th-century Bulgarian people
21st-century Bulgarian people